Wispelaere is a surname. Notable people with the surname include:

 Jean-Philippe Wispelaere, former intelligence analyst for the Australian Defence Intelligence Organisation
 Paul de Wispelaere (1928–2016), Flemish writer